The Montauk Building – also referred to as Montauk Block – was a high-rise building in Chicago, Illinois.

History 
Designed by John Wellborn Root Sr. and Daniel Burnham, it was built in 1882–1883, and was demolished in 1902.  According to Thomas Tallmadge, "What Chartres was to the Gothic cathedral, the Montauk Block was to the high commercial building".

In his non-fiction book set at the World's Columbian Exposition, The Devil in the White City (2003), author Erik Larson claims that the Montauk became the first building to be called a "skyscraper" (Larson 2003: 29). In his 1974 monograph Burnham of Chicago, Thomas Hines makes a similar claim.

The Montauk is also the first building in the world where construction continued through the evenings, and allegedly was the first building in Chicago to not have winter stop construction efforts.

Other early high-rise buildings in the US, according to Scientific American, December 1997: the Equitable Building (1868–70), the Western Union Building (1872–75) and the Tribune Building (1873–75), all in New York City.

It has 150 offices, 300 occupants, and 2 passenger elevators. Erected in 1882, at a cost of $325,000; the first high steel building in Chicago."

From 1903-1965, the First National Bank Building occupied the site.  In 1965, this was demolished to make way for First National Plaza (now called Chase Tower).

See also
 Chicago architecture
 Daniel Burnham
 John Root

Notes

Skyscraper office buildings in Chicago
Former buildings and structures in Chicago
Demolished buildings and structures in Chicago
Commercial buildings completed in 1883
Buildings and structures demolished in 1902
Chicago school architecture in Illinois
1883 establishments in Illinois
1900s disestablishments in Illinois